Delfi is a Winboard/UCI chess engine written in Pascal designed by Italian chess programmer Fabio Cavicchio. It is designed to emulate a human playing style and is rated 2627 on the Chess Engines Grand Tournament. The latest released version is 5.4. Source code for version 5.1 is available.

Technical details
From its release page, Delfi does not use bitboards like Crafty, but uses 16 × 16 array of bytes for board presentation. It uses capture history heuristic and smart thinking time allocation, from 50% to 400% of the average time. When some moves seem equal in its evaluation, it makes random moves.

See also

 Computer chess
 World Computer Speed Chess Championship

References

External links
 

Chess engines